Charles Monro may refer to:
Sir Charles Monro, 1st Baronet (1860–1929), Governor of Gibraltar
Charles Monro (rugby union) (1851–1933), initiator of rugby union in New Zealand
Charles Henry Monro (1835–1908), English author, jurist and benefactor

See also
Charles Monroe (disambiguation)
Charles Munroe